Calhoun County Middle/High School is a coeducational public school serving grades 5 - 12 in Mount Zion, West Virginia.  In addition to the Middle/High School there are two elementary schools. The elementary schools are located at Arnoldsburg and Pleasant Hill.

History
Calhoun County High School was originally erected in the township of Grantsville, West Virginia. Later on, due to an aging building, a new school building was constructed in Mount Zion, West Virginia. The newly constructed building, in addition to providing updated facilities, changed the structure of the Calhoun Education System.

2012-2014
The Calhoun school system has been plagued with rising debt over the past few years. Despite financial problems, the Calhoun County Board of Education, in 2012, commissioned the building of the Arnoldsburg School. The Arnoldsburg elementary school was completed in 2013, with state of the art furnishings. Nothing from the old building was moved to the new structure. In 2014, the county faced a deficit of over 800,000 dollars. With the rising debt and the loss of students, the board of education proposed a new levy to raise needed funds from Calhoun County residents. In the wake of the financial upheaval many of the county's extracurricular programs were at risk of being discontinued.

2016
With the help of community members and local businesses a new basketball court was completed during the summer of 2016. Calhoun County Middle High School has made changes in education approaches through the adoption of SREB's High Schools That Work and Simulated Work Place initiates.

Partnerships
Calhoun County Middle High School has been a long-standing partner with Glenville State College. Through the collaboration, college classes have been made available to high school students and the local community. Additionally, West Virginia University has worked with Calhoun High School to offer students higher education classes.

Calhoun County Middle/High School Alma Mater 

"Alma Mater, Calhoun High 
We stand to sing thy praise,
With hearts that fill with worthy pride
At thought of high school days.
Our friendship true, our spirit too,
A part of us shall be.
Alma Mater, Calhoun High
We will be true to thee
Yes, through the long, long years to come
Wherever we may be,
Alma Mater, Calhoun High
We will be true to thee."

References

External links
Official Site

Public high schools in West Virginia
Public middle schools in West Virginia
Educational institutions established in 1998
Schools in Calhoun County, West Virginia
Buildings and structures in Calhoun County, West Virginia
1998 establishments in West Virginia